Sjóvar Municipality (Faroese: Sjóvar kommuna) is a municipality of the Faroe Islands. The name of the municipality has its origins  from the farm Sjógv á Strondum which gave name to Sjóvar parish. The name comes from the Faroese word for seawater (sjógvur). 
Sjóvar covers a part of the island of Eysturoy. It consists of the villages of Strendur, Innan Glyvur, Selatrað, Morskranes and Kolbanargjógv.

References

External links
Official website

Municipalities of the Faroe Islands
Eysturoy